General St. Clair may refer to:

Arthur St. Clair (1737–1818), American officer in American Revolutionary War who later served in the Ohio Territories
James St Clair (1688–1762), Scottish soldier and Whig politician

See also
James St Clair-Erskine, 2nd Earl of Rosslyn (1762–1837), British Army general